Asclerobia gilvaria is a species of snout moth in the genus Asclerobia. It was described by Hiroshi Yamanaka in 2006, and is known from Japan.

References

Further reading
 (2006). "Descriptions of four new species of the subfamily Phycitinae (Pyralidae) from Japan". Tinea. 19 (3): 180-187.

Moths described in 2006
Endemic fauna of Japan
Phycitini
Moths of Japan